Wilsdruff is a town in the Sächsische Schweiz-Osterzgebirge, in Saxony, Germany, with 14,444 inhabitants (2020). It is situated 14 km west of Dresden centre. Kesselsdorf is one of its subdivisions.

Near Wilsdruff there is a facility for high power broadcasting, the Wilsdruff transmitter.

Wilsdruff is home to KNOX, a traditional incense manufacturer and magnussoft, a computer game developer.

In 2017 the town made headlines as 36% of the population voted the German right wing party AfD (Alternative fuer Deutschland) while in the same year only 10 asylum seekers sought refuge in Wilsdruff.

References